The Royal Rajasthan on Wheels is a luxury tourist train run by Indian Railways. It is modelled on the Palace on Wheels, and follows a similar route through Rajasthan. Tourists are taken to several important tourist, wildlife and heritage sites across Rajasthan. The luxury train was launched in January 2009 following the success of the Palace on Wheels, another luxury train that travels through Rajasthan.

See also

Fairy Queen
Palace on Wheels
Royal Orient
Deccan Odyssey
Mahaparinirvan Express
Golden Chariot
Maharajas' Express

References

External links
 RTDC website

Luxury trains in India
Rail transport in Rajasthan
Tourism in Rajasthan
Transport in Udaipur
2009 establishments in Rajasthan